George Albert Hastings (13 January 1877 – 29 January 1956) was an Australian rules footballer who played for Essendon Football Club in the early years of the Victorian Football League (VFL).

Hastings usually played on the wing but was also a centreman at times. A member of Essendon's inaugural premiership team in 1897 and again in 1901, Hastings also played in losing Grand Final sides in 1898 and 1902. He represented the Victorian interstate team against South Australia in 1903. His career ended when he began suffering from rheumatic fever and he later returned to the VFL as an umpire.

References

Sources

Essendon Football Club profile

1877 births
1956 deaths
Australian rules footballers from Victoria (Australia)
Australian Rules footballers: place kick exponents
Essendon Football Club players
Essendon Football Club Premiership players
North Melbourne Football Club (VFA) players
Australian Football League umpires
Two-time VFL/AFL Premiership players
People from Port Fairy